Anwar Ditta (born 1953 in Birmingham, died 2021) was a British anti-deportation activist. She is best known for successfully campaigning against the Home Office to allow her children to immigrate to the UK in the late-1970s and early-1980s. She died in late-2021.

References 

1953 births
2021 deaths
British activists
British people of Pakistani descent
People from Birmingham, West Midlands